HMS Egmont was a 74-gun third rate ship of the line of the Royal Navy, launched on 7 March 1810 at Northfleet.

In January 1819, the London Gazette reported that Parliament had voted a grant to all those who had served under the command of Lord Viscount Keith in 1812, between 1812 and 1814, and in the Gironde. Egmont was listed among the vessels that had served under Keith in the Gironde.

She was converted to serve as a storeship in 1862, and was sold out of the Navy in 1875.

Notes, citations and references
Notes

Citations

References

Lavery, Brian (2003) The Ship of the Line - Volume 1: The development of the battlefleet 1650-1850. Conway Maritime Press. .

Ships of the line of the Royal Navy
Vengeur-class ships of the line
Ships built in Northfleet
1810 ships